Ray Connellan (born 29 June 1994) is an Irish former Australian rules footballer with the St Kilda Football Club in the Australian Football League. He previously played Gaelic football with his local club Athlone and was also a member of the senior Westmeath county team. In July 2016, he signed with Australian rules football club, St Kilda as a category B rookie.

References

External links

 

1994 births
Living people
Athlone Gaelic footballers
Donegal Boston Gaelic footballers
Gaelic footballers who switched code
Irish players of Australian rules football
Sandringham Football Club players
Westmeath inter-county Gaelic footballers